The Judas Gift is a Big Finish Productions audio drama featuring Lisa Bowerman as Bernice Summerfield, a character from the spin-off media based on the long-running British science fiction television series Doctor Who.

Plot 
The Collection is caught up in the war between the Draconians and the Mim. As Bev tries to ensure they stay neutral, it becomes apparent that the Draconian Ambassador may have other motives for seeing her...

Cast
Bernice Summerfield - Lisa Bowerman
Bev Tarrant - Louise Faulkner
Kothar - Michael Fenner
Adrian - Harry Myers
Braxiatel - Miles Richardson
Reporter - Gary Russell
Doggles -  Sam Stevens
Joseph - Steven Wickham
Hass - Paul Wolfe

Reception
Steve Mollmann, writing for Unreality-sf, described "Wallace’s plotting and character work is top-notch".

References

External links
 Big Finish Productions - Professor Bernice Summerfield: The Judas Gift
 Audio Reviews

Bernice Summerfield audio plays
Fiction set in the 27th century